Pseudochoeromorpha is a genus of longhorn beetles of the subfamily Lamiinae, containing the following species:

 Pseudochoeromorpha lar (Pascoe, 1865)
 Pseudochoeromorpha ochracea (Thomson, 1878)
 Pseudochoeromorpha siamensis (Breuning, 1936)
 Pseudochoeromorpha vagemarmorata (Breuning, 1961)

References

Mesosini